The Korea National University of Transportation (KNUT) is a public, national university in Chungju City, North Chungcheong province and Uiwang City, Gyeonggi province, South Korea. The university was created in 2012 by merging Chungju National University and Korea National Railroad College. Chungju National University was established in 1962 in Chungju, which is one of the public Universities that established after independence. Korea National University is the only public university specialized and focused their education and research on transportation and communication on top of Engineering and Technology. After merging with Korea National Railroad College, it has 3 campuses across Korea; main campus in Chungju, biotechnology and nursing campus in Jeongpeung and transportation and communication campus in Seoul. It enrolls about 200 graduate and 8,000 undergraduate students, and employs about 295 professors.  The president of the university is Dr. Park joon-hoon.

Academics

The university's undergraduate and graduate offerings are provided through its seven colleges and one school:

College of Engineering
Department of Energy System Engineering
Department of Industrial & Management Engineering
Department of Safety Engineering
Department of Materials Science and Engineering
Major in Environmental Engineering
Major in Environmental System Engineering
Department of Chemical and Biological Engineering
Department of Polymer Science and Engineering
Department of Bioengineering

College of Construction Engineering and Design
Department of Civil Engineering
Department of Urban Engineering
Department of Architectural Engineering
Department of Architecture (5-years program)
Department of Industrial Design
Department of Transportation Facility Engineering
Department of Aircraft Operation
Department of Information Design
Department of Transportation Ecology Engineering

College of Convergence Technology
Department of Electrical Engineering
Department of Electronic Engineering
Department of Mechanical Engineering
Department of Automobile Engineering
Department of Aeronautical Engineering
Department of Computer Science
Department of Software Engineering
Department of Biomedical Engineering
Department of AI Robot Engineering

College of Humanities
Department of English Language & Literature
Department of English
Department of Chinese 
Department of Music
Department of Creative Writing
Department of Sports & Health Science

College of Social Sciences
Department of Public Administration
Department of Public Administration & Information System
Department of Business Administration
Department of Management Information System
Department of Transportation Service Management

College of Health and life Sciences
Department of Nursing
Department of Physical Therapy
Department of Emergency Medical Service
Department of Food Science & Technology
Department of Biotechnology
Department of Medical IT Engineering
Department of Early Childhood Special Education

College of International, Social and information Science
Department of Early Childhood Education
Department of Computer Multimedia Engineering
Department of Social Welfare
Department of International Business & Commerce

School of Liberal Arts and Sciences
This school offers various general and introductory courses. It focuses on planning curricula to cultivate empowered students with global and creative minds. Students will mainly take courses such as on social and pure sciences, Korean language, foreign languages, humanities, social sciences and natural sciences.Homepage

History

The school opened in 1962 as Chungju Technical Junior College, a two-year school.  It became Chungju Technical College, offering a five-year program, in 1965, and was nationalized in 1971.  However, it was returned to the status of a two-year junior college in 1974.  It was moved to its present-day location in 1982.  Eleven years later in 1993, it became a four-year university, Chungju National University of Industry. In March 2006 it merged Cheongju National College of Science and Technology (Jeungpyeong campus now).

Sister schools

The university maintains domestic sisterhood relationships with numerous institutions, including Korea's 19 other universities of industry.  In addition, it has international ties with 30 universities in 15 countries:  the United States (University of Sacramento), Bangladesh (University of Development Alternative) China (Beijing University of Technology, Yanbian University, Yanbian University of Science and Technology, Xuzhou Institute of Technology and Shanghai University), the Philippines (De La Salle University-Manila), Japan (Oita University and Kyushu Institute of Technology), Kazakhstan (Al-Farabi University and Pavlodar National University), Uzbekistanthe (Samarkand State Institute of Foreign Languages), India (University of Delhi), Canada (Nova Scotia Agricultural College) United Kingdom (University of Westminster), and Australia (Deakin University).

See also
List of national universities in South Korea
List of universities and colleges in South Korea
Education in Korea

References

External links
Official school website 
Official school website 

Universities and colleges in North Chungcheong Province
Chungju
National universities and colleges in South Korea
2012 establishments in South Korea
Educational institutions established in 2012